is a Japanese actress, voice actress, singer and narrator from Nagoya, Aichi. Her most famous role is the voice of the children's hero Anpanman on the long running anime Soreike! Anpanman. She was also the voice of Thomas the Tank Engine in the Japanese dub of Thomas & Friends from Season 1 to Season 8. She was once married to Shuichi Ikeda and Junichi Inoue.

Career
She first became an actress in fifth grade and then relocated to Tokyo in 1973 to become an idol singer. She then later joined Nachi Nozawa's theatre company. Also a musical theatre actress, she has appeared in musicals like "Sweet Charity" and "Dance of the Fleet Lady".
She won Japanese Academy Award as the supporting actress for Welcome Back, Mr. McDonald in 1997.

Toda has dubbed over actresses like Jodie Foster, Linda Hamilton, Sigourney Weaver, Sandra Bullock, Michelle Pfeiffer and Carrie Anne Moss for dubs of American live-action movies. She's voiced Rui Kisugi for the new animated City Hunter movie, taking over from fellow voice actress Toshiko Fujita, whom she had a sister-like relationship with. Her hobbies include dancing, singing, driving, watching Broadway musicals and poem chanting.

Filmography

Film
Welcome Back, Mr. McDonald (1997), Nokko Senbon
Tales of the Unusual (2000), Riku
Minna no Ie (2001), customer
Nin x Nin (2004), Taeko Mitsuba
The Uchōten Hotel (2006), Tokiko Yabe
Kabei: Our Mother (2008), Teruyo Nogami (adult)
Into the White Night (2011), Yaiko Kirihara
A Ghost of a Chance (2011), Landlady
The Kiyosu Conference (2013), Naka
Stardust Over the Town (2020)
Good-Bye (2020)
His (2020), Sakurai
We Made a Beautiful Bouquet (2021), Sachiko Hachiya
Sono Koe no Anata e (2022), herself
Yudō (2023)

Television
Sōrito Yobanaide (1997)
Shomuni (1998), Azusa Tokunaga
Hero (2001), Kanako Moriwaki
Shinsengumi! (2004), Otose
Densha Otoko (2005), Kasumi Yamada
Kimi ga Kureta Natsu (2007), The Nurse
Taiyo to Umi no Kyoshitsu (2008), Kyoka Hasebe
Wagaya no Rekishi (2010), Shizuko Kasagi
From Five to Nine (2015), Keiko Kakuraba
Natsuzora (2019), Kasumi Kemuri
Koeharu! (2021), Meiko's grandmother
The Makanai: Cooking for the Maiko House (2023), Kimie Sakurai

Television animation
Mobile Suit Gundam (1979), Matilda Ajan
Space Runaway Ideon (1980), Karala Ajiba
Queen Millennia (1981), Hajime Amamori
Maya the Honey Bee (1982), Alexander the Mouse (Maushii)
Cat's Eye (1983–85), Hitomi Kisugi
GeGeGe no Kitarō (3rd Series) (1985), Kitarō
Anpanman (1988), Anpanman
Oniisama e... (1991), Kaoru Orihara
Lupin III: The Columbus Files (1999), Rosalia
Requiem from the Darkness (2004), Tatsuta
Healin' Good PreCure (2020), Tiatine
Dragon Quest: The Adventure of Dai (2021), Dragon Crystal and Mother Dragon
Urusei Yatsura (2022), Ataru's mom

Original net animation (ONA)
Lupin the 3rd vs. Cat's Eye (2023), Hitomi Kisugi

Original video animation (OVA)
Fight! Iczer One (1985), Icier Two
Vampire Hunter D (1985), Dan
Yōtōden (1987), Ayanosuke
Iczer Reborn (1990), Iczer Two

Theatrical animation
Mobile Suit Gundam (1981), Matilda Ajan
Mobile Suit Gundam: Soldiers of Sorrow (1981), Matilda Ajan
Space Runaway Ideon: A Contact (1982), Karala Ajiba
Space Runaway Ideon: Be Invoked (1982), Karala Ajiba
Bio Booster Armor Guyver (1986), Valcuria
Toki no Tabibito -Time Stranger- (1986), Agino Jiro
Kiki's Delivery Service (1989), Osono
A Wind Named Amnesia (1990), Sophia
Pokémon 4Ever (2001), Yukinari
Anpanman: Apple Boy and Everyone's Hope (2014), Anpanman
City Hunter the Movie: Shinjuku Private Eyes (2019), Hitomi Kisugi and Rui Kisugi
Code Geass: Lelouch of the Re;surrection (2019), Shamna
Kingdom of Gold, Kingdom of Water (2023), Leopoldine

Video games
Popful Mail (1994), Tatto
Gulliver Boy (1995), Nikita
Jade Cocoon (1998), Garai
Mobile Suit Gundam: Journey to Jaburo (2000), Matilda Ajan
Everybody's Golf 5 (2007), Teana

Puppetry
The Three Musketeers (2009), Milady de Winter
Sherlock Holmes (2014), Isadora Klein

Dubbing

Live-action
Jodie Foster
The Accused (1998 TV Asahi version), Sarah Tobias
The Silence of the Lambs (1995 TV Asahi version), Clarice Starling
Maverick (1997 NTV version), Annabelle Bransford
Nell, Nell Kellty
Contact (2001 TV Tokyo version), Dr. Eleanor Arroway
Anna and the King (2007 TV Tokyo version), Anna Leonowens
Flightplan, Kyle Pratt
Elysium, Defense Secretary Delacourt
Julia Roberts
Pretty Woman, Vivian Ward
Dying Young, Hilary O'Neil
My Best Friend's Wedding, Julianne Potter
Notting Hill, Anna Scott
Erin Brockovich (2003 TV Asahi version), Erin Brockovich
Full Frontal, Catherine/Francesca
Larry Crowne, Mercedes Tainot
Sigourney Weaver
Alien (1992 TV Asahi version), Ellen Ripley
Aliens (1989 TV Asahi version), Ellen Ripley
Alien 3 (1998 TV Asahi version), Ellen Ripley
Alien: Resurrection (1997 Fuji TV version), Ellen Ripley
Political Animals, Elaine Barrish
12 Monkeys, Kathryn Railly (Madeleine Stowe)
American Graffiti (1984 TBS version), Laurie Henderson (Cindy Williams)
Back to the Future Part III (2018 BS Japan version), Clara Clayton (Mary Steenburgen)
Beauty and the Beast, Agathe (Hattie Morahan)
A Better Tomorrow III: Love & Death in Saigon, Chow Ying-kit (Anita Mui)
The Big C, Cathy Jamison (Laura Linney)
Blade Runner (1986 TBS version), Rachael (Sean Young)
Cat People (1985 Fuji TV edition), Irena Gallier (Nastassja Kinski)
Charlie's Angels, Julie Rogers (Tanya Roberts)
Conan the Barbarian (1989 TV Asahi version), Valeria (Sandahl Bergman)
Days of Thunder (1993 TBS version), Dr. Claire Lewicki (Nicole Kidman)
The English Patient, Katharine Clifton (Kristin Scott Thomas)
Eternals, Ajak (Salma Hayek)
The First Lady, Eleanor Roosevelt (Gillian Anderson)
Flashdance, Alexandra "Alex" Owens (Jennifer Beals)
Flubber, Dr. Sara Jean Reynolds (Marcia Gay Harden)
Gone with the Wind (1988 NTV version), Scarlett O'Hara (Vivien Leigh)
The Hand That Rocks the Cradle, Mrs. Mott (Rebecca De Mornay)
Hard to Kill, Andy Stewart (Kelly LeBrock)
Home Alone 3 (2019 NTV edition), Karen Pruitt (Haviland Morris)
I Am Sam (2005 NTV edition), Rita Harrison Williams (Michelle Pfeiffer)
Malcolm X, Betty Shabazz (Angela Bassett)
The Matrix trilogy (Fuji TV version), Trinity (Carrie-Anne Moss)
Medicine Man, Dr. Rae Crane (Lorraine Bracco)
My Big Fat Greek Life, Nia Miller (Nia Vardalos)
Never Talk to Strangers (Dr. Sarah Taylor (Rebecca De Mornay))
The NeverEnding Story (Atreyu (Noah Hathaway)
Nine Months, Rebecca Taylor-Faulkner (Julianne Moore)
The Nude Bomb (1988 TV Asahi edition), Agent 22 (Andrea Howard)
Only Murders in the Building, Jan Bellows (Amy Ryan)
The Others, Grace Stewart (Nicole Kidman)
Playing by Heart, Meredith (Gillian Anderson)
Predator 2, Detective Leona Cantrell (María Conchita Alonso)
Red Sonja, Red Sonja (Brigitte Nielsen)
Rumble in the Bronx, Elaine (Anita Mui)
Scarface (1989 TV Asahi version), Elvira Hancock (Michelle Pfeiffer)
Shazam! Fury of the Gods, Hespera (Helen Mirren)
Showgirls, Cristal Connors (Gina Gershon)
The Sound of Music (2011 TV Tokyo edition), Baroness Elsa von Schraeder (Eleanor Parker)
Speed, Annie Porter (Sandra Bullock)
Speed 2: Cruise Control, Annie Porter (Sandra Bullock)
The Terminator (1987 TV Asahi version), Sarah Connor (Linda Hamilton)
Terminator: Dark Fate, Sarah Connor (Linda Hamilton)
Thomas and the Magic Railroad, Lily's Mother (Lori Hallier)
Trading Places (1986 NTV/1992 Fuji TV edition), Ophelia (Jamie Lee Curtis)
True Lies, Helen Tasker (Jamie Lee Curtis)
Trust the Man, Rebecca (Julianne Moore)
The X-Files (TV Asahi version), Dana Scully (Gillian Anderson)

Animation
Balto, Jenna
Cars, Sally Carrera
Cars 2, Sally Carrera
Cars 3, Sally Carrera
Coraline, Mel Jones and Other Mother/The Beldam
Early Man, the Queen Oofeefa
Final Fantasy: The Spirits Within, Aki Ross
The Simpsons, Dana Scully
Strings, Eike
Thomas & Friends, Thomas the Tank Engine (1990 to 2007)
Thomas and the Magic Railroad, Thomas the Tank Engine
Toy Story, Bo Peep
Toy Story 2, Bo Peep
Toy Story 4, Bo Peep

References

External links 
 Official blog 
 
 
 

1957 births
Living people
Aoni Production voice actors
Japanese child actresses
Japanese film actresses
Japanese musical theatre actresses
Japanese television actresses
Japanese video game actresses
Japanese voice actresses
Voice actresses from Nagoya
20th-century Japanese actresses
21st-century Japanese actresses
20th-century Japanese women singers
20th-century Japanese singers
21st-century Japanese women singers
21st-century Japanese singers